Múlaþing is a municipality in eastern Iceland which was formed in 2020 from the merger of Fljótsdalshérað, Seyðisfjörður, Borgarfjarðarhreppur and Djúpavogshreppur.

It is the largest municipality in the country by area. The biggest town in the municipality is Egilsstaðir, with a population of around 2,500. The second largest town of Seyðisfjörður is one of the oldest towns in Iceland.

The feral reindeer of Iceland are mostly situated in Fljótsdalshérað, where they number between 5,000 and 10,000. The largest forest in Iceland, Hallormsstaðaskógur is also located in Fljótsdalshérað.

The Kárahnjúkar Hydropower Plant is located in the municipality.

References

Municipalities of Iceland
Eastern Region (Iceland)
States and territories established in 2020